Thaleischweiler-Fröschen is a municipality in the Südwestpfalz district, in Rhineland-Palatinate, Germany.

Thaleischweiler-Fröschen is the seat of the Verbandsgemeinde ("collective municipality") Thaleischweiler-Wallhalben.

References

Palatinate Forest
Südwestpfalz